Jeremy Kilongo Sivi (born 18 July 2002) is an English professional footballer who plays as a winger for  club Middlesbrough

Career
Having played youth football for Leyton Orient, Sivi joined Harlow Town on loan in December 2019, where he scored once in 11 league appearances, but was released by Orient at the end of the season. He returned to Harlow Town in October 2020, and made 4 league appearances during this spell at the club.

After playing with Onside Football Academy, he signed a professional contract with EFL Championship club Middlesbrough on 25 May 2021. He made his debut for the club on 10 August 2021 as a substitute in a 3–0 EFL Cup defeat to Blackpool.

Style of play
Sivi plays as a winger, predominiantly on the right.

References

External links

2002 births
Living people
English footballers
Association football wingers
Leyton Orient F.C. players
Harlow Town F.C. players
Middlesbrough F.C. players
Isthmian League players
Black British sportspeople